Passport Act of 1926, 22 U.S.C § 211, is a United States statue authorizing the issuance of United States passports and visas for a validity of two years from the issue date. The Act of Congress provided the United States Department of State authority to limit the validity of a passport or visa in accordance with the Immigration Act of 1924.

The H.R. 12495 legislation was passed by the 69th U.S. Congressional session and enacted into law by the 30th President of the United States Calvin Coolidge on July 3, 1926.

International Relations and U.S. President Calvin Coolidge

See also
 Consular identification card
 Emergency Quota Act
 Passport Act of 1782
 Reed–Jenkins Act
 United States Foreign Service

References

Bibliography

External links
 
 

1926 in American law
1926 in the United States
69th United States Congress